A by-election was held for the Lagos seat in the Legislative Council of Nigeria in 1940. It followed the death of incumbent Olayinka Alakija, who had been a member of the Nigerian Youth Movement (NYM). Jibril Martin of the NYM was elected with 64% of the vote.

Campaign
Martin and Samuel Akisanya both sought the NYM nomination, with Martin chosen as the party's candidate. His opponent was Crispin Adeniyi-Jones, a doctor who had been a member of the Legislative Council from 1923 until losing his seat in the 1938 elections.

Results

References

1940
1940 elections in Africa
1940 in Nigeria
20th century in Lagos